P. S. Veerappa (10 September 191111 September 1998) was an Indian actor and a producer of Tamil cinema.

Early life
Born in 1911, Veerappa belonged to Kangeyam, then part of Coimbatore District in Madras Presidency. But he grew up in his grandfather’s house in Pollachi right from an early age. He was  interested in studies but there were no income sources due to large members in family. He tried many small trading business which never gave him good returns. Before moving to Madras he used to act in plays which was conducted in temple festival in nearby temple town Sivanmalai where he saw K. B. Sundarambal and her brother. They insisted him to join cinema and told him to come to Madras. So he moved to Madras with the aim of joining cinema; he expressed his desire to her and Sundarambal sent him to Ellis R. Dungan with a recommendation letter.

Career
Duncan was directing the film Manimekalai at that time in which Sundarambal had an important role. And, Veerappa was introduced to cinema through that film in 1939. His next films were Udayanan Vasavadatta, in which G. N. Balasubramaniam and Vasundhara Devi were the lead pair and Jupiter Pictures’ Sri Murugan with C. Honnappa Bhagavathar as the hero. M. G. Ramachandran was also in the cast and Veerappa and became friends with him after this film. Their duo acted in many films together as hero and villain. Veerappa’s popular laughter "ha ..ha ..haa .." was first tried in the film Chakravarthi Thirumagal in which MGR was the hero. As it had tremendous response, it was continued by Veerappa in all his subsequent films and it became his trademark. In the film Vanjikottai Valiban, there is a dance sequence in which Vyjayanthimala and Padmini are both dancing, challenging each other in the song Kannum Kannum Kalanthu. In this scene, Veerappa shouts, "Sabhaash … sariyana potti …", welcoming the challenge. And, in another film Mahadhevi, Veerappa, the villain, would chase the heroine K. Savithri with so much lust. In the scene in which he realizes that he could never get Savithri, he would say, "Manadhaal Mahadevi, illaiyel maranadevi …". This dialogue gets consistent claps from the audience even today. He was associated with six Chief Ministers (C. N. Annadurai, M. Karunanidhi, M. G. Ramachandran, N. T. Rama Rao, V. N. Janaki & J. Jayalalitha) as an actor and producer.

Sivaji Ganesan was a great admirer and fan of Veerappa’s acting and his ‘famous’ laughter. Sivaji had openly expressed this admiration on many occasions. Veerappa had acted as the villain with four generation heroes, starting from MGR and Sivaji to heroes like Kamal Haasan, Rajinikanth and Vijayakanth. A molded villain in movies, Veerappa was a great human being in real life. He became a producer also and produced many films. Veerappa, died in September 1998. He had a daughter and a son. His son P. S. V. Hariharan is a film producer, and has a daughter and a son.

Filmography

As actor

As producer

References

External links
 

1911 births
1998 deaths
Male actors from Tamil Nadu
Tamil male actors
People from Coimbatore district
20th-century Indian male actors
Male actors in Tamil cinema
Tamil film producers
Film producers from Tamil Nadu